Marek Losey  (born August 1971 in St Mary's Hospital, Paddington, London) is a British film and television director; he is the third generation of film maker in the Losey family.

Filmography

Television

Family history and personal life
Marek Losey is the grandson of American film director Joseph Losey and American fashion designer Elizabeth Hawes. He is the son of American film producer Gavrik Losey and the former British ballerina Sally Chesterton Losey, and the nephew of actor Joshua Losey. His older brother, Luke Losey, is also a film director. Marek Losey grew up in London, England, he attended Hallfield School in Bayswater. From the age of 12 he then attended boarding school at Dartington Hall School in Devon. Marek is married to producer Sophie Losey, together they have two children, Joachim and Eve Losey, they live in North London, England. Marek and Sophie's children also work in the film industry.

References

Film4 interview with Marek Losey on The Hide : http://www.film4.com/special-features/interviews/marek-losey-on-the-hide
LoveFilm Interview with Marek Losey at  Cannes Film Festival https://www.youtube.com/watch?v=TImxKnMbdew
The Independent, interview with Marek Losey: https://www.independent.co.uk/arts-entertainment/films/features/closeup-marek-losey-1696210.html
British Independent Film Awards, nominations & winners 2009 https://www.bifa.film/awards/winners/2009
Evening Standard British Film Awards, nominations 2010 https://www.imdb.com/event/ev0000231/2010
Writers' Guild of Great Britain, nominations & winners 2010 https://www.imdb.com/event/ev0000712/2010
Film4, The Hide review :http://www.film4.com/reviews/2008/the-hide
Sky Movies, The Hide review, http://movies.sky.com/the-hide/review
Eye For Film, The Hide review, http://www.eyeforfilm.co.uk/reviews.php?id=8101
The Guardian review, The Hide https://www.theguardian.com/film/2009/jun/05/the-hide-film-review
Turino Film Festival, Marek Losey introduces Joseph Losey retrospective http://www.ilsole24ore.com/art/cultura/2012-11-21/torino-film-festival-torna-135904.shtml?uuid=AbxDF54G&refresh_ce=1
iFeatures interview with Marek Losey http://www.creativeengland.co.uk/story/ifeatures-video-director-marek-losey
BFI, Marek Losey http://www.bfi.org.uk/films-tv-people/4ce2bdd721e0d
Time Out review, The Hide http://www.timeout.com/london/film/the-hide
Daily Express review, The Hide http://www.express.co.uk/entertainment/films/105493/The-Hide
Dinard film festival, film showcase 2008 http://www.cafebabel.co.uk/article/dinard-showcases-uk-film.html
Dinard showcases UK film, Cineuropa 2008 http://cineuropa.org/nw.aspx?t=newsdetail&l=en&did=86865
The Telegraph review, 13 Steps Down https://www.telegraph.co.uk/culture/tvandradio/9474881/Thirteen-Steps-Down-ITV1-review.html
28 Days Later, The Hide review, http://www.28dayslateranalysis.com/2011/08/hide-and-mysterious-pasts-movie-review.html
Radio Times, Cold Is The Grave review http://www.radiotimes.com/tv-programme/e/nhsbk/dci-banks-cold-is-the-grave---part-two
Huffington Post review, The Poison Tree http://www.huffingtonpost.co.uk/2012/12/10/tv-review-the-poison-tree-episode-1_n_2273231.html
The Mirror review, The Poison Tree https://www.mirror.co.uk/tv/tv-previews/itv1-the-poison-tree-is-a-gripping-but-implausible-1482371\
The Guardian review, The Poison Tree https://www.theguardian.com/tv-and-radio/2012/dec/10/tv-review-the-poison-tree
Arts Desk, The Poison Tree review http://www.theartsdesk.com/tv/poison-tree-itv1
Arts Desk, 13 Steps Down review http://www.theartsdesk.com/tv/ruth-rendells-thirteen-steps-down-itv1
TV Wise, Breathless review http://www.tvwise.co.uk/2013/04/iain-glen-shaun-dingwall-more-cast-in-itvs-1960s-medical-drama-series-breathless/
BBC, Silent Witness – Squaring The Circle http://www.bbc.co.uk/programmes/b051clcj
Variety review, The Hide https://variety.com/2014/tv/reviews/tv-review-breathless-1201280403/
ITV News Vera, season 5 http://www.itv.com/presscentre/press-releases/filming-commences-brenda-blethyn-returns-fifth-series-itv%E2%80%99s-popular-crime-drama-vera
Prolific North, Vera season 5 wins RTS award http://www.prolificnorth.co.uk/2016/02/vera-and-the-dumping-ground-among-winners-at-rts-north-east-and-border-awards/
Telegraph, Vera, season 6 review https://www.telegraph.co.uk/tv/2016/02/01/vera-series-six-episode-one-review-rescued-by-blethyn/
TV Wise, Brief Encounters http://www.tvwise.co.uk/2016/06/itv-sets-premiere-date/
Trip Wire Magazine, Beowulf interview Marek Losey http://www.tripwiremagazine.co.uk/interview/marek-losey-speaks/
NTA award nominations 2016 http://www.nationaltvawards.com/vote
McmBuzz review, Beowulf episode 11 review, directed by Marek Losey http://www.mymbuzz.com/2016/03/14/beowulf-return-to-the-shieldlands-s01e11-episode-11-review/
McmBuzz review, Beowulf episode 12 review, directed by Marek Losey http://www.mcmbuzz.com/blog/2016/03/21/beowulf-return-to-the-shieldlands-s01e12-episode-12-review/
Den Of Geek review episode 12 review, directed by Marek Losey http://www.denofgeek.com/tv/beowulf-return-to-the-shieldlands/39392/beowulf-return-to-the-shieldlands-episode-12-review
Esquire Network Beowulf https://web.archive.org/web/20160812071514/http://tv.esquire.com/shows/beowulf
Hollywood.com Beowulf cast and crew listings http://www.hollywood.com/tv/beowulf-59540735/credits/
Marek Losey talks to Tripwire Magazine on Stan Lee's Lucky Man http://www.tripwiremagazine.co.uk/headlines/marek-losey-talks-stan-lees-lucky-man/

External links
  The Hide official movie trailer, 2009
  Marek Losey website
 Marek Losey Twitter
 

1971 births
Living people
English film directors
People educated at Dartington Hall School
People from Paddington
English people of American descent